Paretta Autosport is an automotive racing organization owned by Beth Paretta, the former director of SRT Motorsports. Paretta Autosport is scheduled to compete in the 2021 Indianapolis 500 IndyCar race with driver Simona De Silvestro. The #16 Chevrolet-powered entry will be supported by a technical partnership with Team Penske.

Paretta was previously team principal of Grace Autosport, a team that planned to compete at the 2016 Indy 500, but ultimately did not attempt to qualify.

Results summary

Complete IndyCar Series results
(key)

References

IndyCar Series teams
American auto racing teams
Auto racing teams established in 2021